New England College of Business (or NECB) is a Private college in Boston, Massachusetts. Founded in 1909, NECB grants associate, bachelor's, and graduate degrees in Business, Digital Marketing and International Business. It is accredited by the New England Commission of Higher Education. As of 2020, the school no longer operates independently and is a subdivision of Cambridge College.

History 
NECB was founded as the American Banking Institute (ABI) in 1909, the institute was later incorporated by the Commonwealth of Massachusetts in 1914.

ABI received their degree-granting authority in 1979 from the Board of Regents of Higher Education in Massachusetts to offer an associate degree in business administration.  In 1985, ABI received full college accreditation from the New England Association of Schools and College – the only bank sponsored educational institution in America to become accredited as a degree-granting college.  In 1988, the member banks associated with ABI expanded throughout New England and later voted to change the name to the New England Banking Institute.

Following the adoption of the name The New England Banking Institute (NEBI), NEBI received official licensure from the state of Connecticut Department of Higher Education in 1990.  Connecticut was the first state outside of Massachusetts to recognize Boston-based NEBI as a degree-granting college.  Rhode Island approved NEBI in 1993, while New Hampshire recognized the college in 1997.  In 1998, The New England Banking Institute changed names to New England College of Finance.

NECB Online 
In 2002, NECF selected the Alfred P. Sloan Foundation as a partner to deliver their degree programs online.  The first online degree programs were delivered through NECFOnline.

In 2004, UC Berkeley adopted NECF’s finance curriculum to include in their post-baccalaureate level online certificate program for college graduates in banking and investment management sectors. The “Accelerated Program in Financial Services” was launched in April 2004. UC Berkeley credits were transferred into master’s programs at prominent NECF partner colleges.

In 2008, NECF changed its name to New England College of Business and Finance and was also granted degree elevation authority.  In 2009, NECB introduced its Bachelor of Science in Business Administration (BSBA), a Master of Science in Finance (MSF), and the nation’s first Master of Science in Business Ethics and Compliance (MBEC).

In 2010, NECB began working with Banker's Academy to develop enhanced educational opportunities and degree completion options to students. Courses taken through Banker’s Academy may transfer as credit to one of NECB’s online degree programs, including: Bachelor’s degrees focused in marketing, management, business administration, banking and finance, or accounting.

In 2011, New England College of Business introduced its Master of Business Administration (MBA) program. Since 2011, the College has introduced two additional graduate programs: Master of Human Resource Management (MHRM) and Master of Healthcare Management (MHM). Two additional undergraduate programs have also begun during that time period: Bachelor of Science in Digital Marketing (BSDM) and Bachelor of Science in International Business (BSIB).

In 2014, NECB was awarded the 2014 Gold Best Practices Award for Distance Learning Programming from the U.S. Distance Learning Association (USDLA) and the Association for Continuing Higher Education (ACHE) Award for Creative Use of Technology for its online textbook center.

Academics

Accreditation 
New England College of Business (NECB) is accredited by the New England Commission of Higher Education and approved by the Massachusetts Department of Higher Education.

Undergraduate programs 
The school offers an Associate degree in business and a Bachelor of Science degree in three different business-related programs. The Bachelor of Science degrees include a Bachelor of Science in Business Administration, a Bachelor of Science in Digital Marketing, and a Bachelor of Science in International Business.

Graduate programs 
The school offers five master’s degree programs and accepts admission applications throughout the year. All coursework is delivered via an instructional model that integrates video lectures, audio feedback and peer interaction. Students have access to professors and practitioners, as well as library resources. The NECB technology platform allows students to work on or offline with access to all course materials.

Certificate programs 
New England College of Business (NECB) professional certificate programs offer:
Undergraduate Certificates (Accounting and Digital Marketing)
Graduate Certificates (Financial Management, Global Finance Trading, Intermediate Accounting)

References

External links
 Official website

Distance education institutions based in the United States
Educational institutions established in 1909
Universities and colleges in Boston
1909 establishments in Massachusetts